The Wizard of Odds is an American television game show hosted by Alex Trebek that aired on NBC from July 16, 1973, to June 28, 1974, in which people from the studio audience vied in a number of rounds, primarily games revolving around statistical questions. John Harlan announced the pilot; Los Angeles radio personality Sam Riddle was the show's first announcer; towards the end of the run, Charlie O'Donnell replaced him. The title was a parody of the classic 1939 movie The Wizard of Oz and was Trebek's first American game show he hosted.

Broadcast history
Relatively short-lived, The Wizard of Odds replaced Sale of the Century with Joe Garagiola at 11:00 a.m. Eastern (10:00 Central). The show did not perform well against CBS' Gambit (later replaced by Now You See It with Jack Narz) and NBC dropped it after less than a year.

Wizard was Trebek's first American game show, after starting his broadcast career in his native Canada. He later hosted four more NBC games, High Rollers (which replaced Wizard), from 1974 to 1976 and again as The New High Rollers from 1978 to 1980, Battlestars from 1981 to 1982 and again as The New Battlestars in 1983 Classic Concentration from 1987 to 1991. Finally, his fourth one was a brief revival of To Tell the Truth in 1991. Beginning in 1984, he hosted the syndicated TV hit game Jeopardy! until his death in 2020.

Episode status
It is believed that the series was wiped as per network policy of the era, with NBC continuing this policy until 1979. The May 20, 1974 episode with special guest actor Don DeFore exists in the UCLA Film & Television Archive. An audio recording of the finale also exists. 

One surviving episode, labeled as airing on March 19, 1974, was uploaded to YouTube on October 12, 2022.

Rules of the game
Contestants were selected from the studio audience and answered questions based on statistical information, all for cash and prizes.

"The Wizard" (Trebek) began the show by choosing three contestants and asking them questions based on the law of averages, with cash and prizes awarded accordingly for correct answers; an example of a question was "What are the odds a man will recover his lost wallet if there is more than $20 inside it?"

The next three players were given a series of phrases and told to pick the one that did not match. The person with the most correct answers was given the chance to pick one of five prizes, located behind windows that were either "open" or "locked". This person could continue to play or stop at any time, keeping the prizes; however, selecting a window that was locked lost all prizes accumulated up to that point.

Every contestant selected had his or her name added to the "Wizard's Wheel of Fortune."

Wizard's Wheel of Fortune
At the end of the show, Trebek spun the wheel and the person it landed on was eligible for bonus gifts. A list of averages was then brought out, with a number above it. The contestant had to pick a group of items whose average added up to exactly the target number. If the contestant was correct, he or she won the bonus gifts, including a brand new car.

Theme
The theme song was composed and sung by Alan Thicke, who was also one of the show's producers.

Lawsuit
Nearly a week after the show debuted, Leo Guild (who has created numerous radio and television shows, books, and newspaper columns) filed a $2 million lawsuit against NBC for stealing his Wizard title, which had been used as a newspaper column during the late 1940s.

References

External links
 

NBC original programming
1970s American game shows
1973 American television series debuts
1974 American television series endings
English-language television shows
Lost television shows